Saffi may refer to:
Aurelio Saffi (1819–1890), Italian politician
Safi, Morocco, a city in Western Morocco
Piazza Saffi, a plaza in Forlì, Italy
Via Saffi, a major road in Casale Monferrato, Alessandria, Italy